St. Paul's School (also known as St. Paul's or SPS) is a highly selective college-preparatory, coeducational boarding school in Concord, New Hampshire, affiliated with the Episcopal Church. It is often regarded as one of the most elite boarding schools in the United States. The school's , or 3.125 square mile, campus currently serves 539 students, who come from 40 states and 18 countries.

Established in 1856 to educate boys from upper-class families, St. Paul's later became one of the first boys' boarding schools to admit girls and is now home to a diverse student body from all backgrounds. While the school accepted 15% of applicants for the 2020-21 academic year, its 2016–2019 graduates matriculated most at Harvard, Yale, Columbia, UPenn, Brown, Cornell, Dartmouth, and Georgetown. Although annual tuition is $62,000, St. Paul's provides financial aid to 39% of its students and fully meets any admitted student's demonstrated financial need with an average award of $56,182. The school's endowment is valued at $631 million as of June 2019, ranking third among American boarding schools.

The first ice hockey games in the United States were played at St. Paul's in the 1870s and the first squash court in the country was opened at the school in 1884. Home to the likes of Hobey Baker and Malcolm Gordon, the St. Paul's hockey team played and beat collegiate teams such as Harvard and Princeton in the sport's early days. St. Paul's is a member of the Eight Schools Association and was formerly a member of the Independent School League, the oldest independent school athletic association in the United States. St. Paul's crew has won the Princess Elizabeth Challenge Cup at the Henley Royal Regatta three times, the latest being in 2004.

The school's list of notable alumni includes numerous US ambassadors, congressmen, senators, Pulitzer Prize winners, a Secretary of State, and a Nobel laureate, among others.

History
In 1856, Harvard University-educated physician and Boston Brahmin George Cheyne Shattuck, inspired by the educational theories of Johann Heinrich Pestalozzi, turned his country home in the hamlet of Millville, New Hampshire, into a school for boys. Shattuck wanted his boys educated in the austere, bucolic countryside. A newly appointed board of trustees chose Henry Coit, a 24-year-old clergyman, to preside over the school for its first 39 years. In addition to Shattuck's two boys and Coit and his wife, there was one other student. The original location was 50 acres, but over the years surrounding lands were acquired.

Throughout the latter half of the 19th century, the school expanded. In the 1870s, the first ice hockey games in the U.S. were played on the Lower Pond. During the infancy of ice hockey in the United States, the school established itself as a powerhouse that often played and beat collegiate teams at Harvard and Yale. Its Lower School Pond once held nine hockey rinks. In 1884, it built the first squash courts in America. Both ice hockey and squash were introduced to the school by James Potter Conover, one of the most celebrated athletes of his time in the United States, who had also competed for Columbia during his time as a student there. By 1895, when Coit died, the school had 35 teachers and 345 students.

In 1910, Samuel Smith Drury took over as rector. Drury, who had served as a missionary in the Philippines, found St. Paul's in almost all aspects — student body, faculty, and curriculum — severely lacking a serious commitment to academic pursuits and moral upstandingness. Accordingly, he presided over, among other things, the hiring of better teachers, the tightening of academic standards, and the dissolution of secret societies and their replacement with a student council. Drury also presided over the school throughout the 1920s and 1930s during what August Hecksher called its "Augustan era".

The first faculty and students of color arrived at the school in 1957 and 1959, respectively. The following decade ushered in a turbulent period for St. Paul's. In 1968, students wrote an acerbic manifesto describing the school administration as an oppressive regime. As a result of this manifesto, seated meals were reduced from three times a day to four times a week, courses were shortened to be terms (rather than years) long, Chapel was reduced to four times a week, and the school's grading system was changed to eliminate + and - grades (re-introduced in 2016) and given its current High Honors, Honors, High Pass, Pass, and Unsatisfactory labels instead of A–F. By the end of the sixties, St. Paul's had begun to admit sizable numbers of minorities in every class, had secularized its previously strict religious schedule considerably, expanded its course offerings, and was poised to begin coeducation. It admitted girls for the first time in 1971, becoming one of the first boys' boarding schools to do so. The Arts program was also expanded in the early seventies, while the interdisciplinary Humanities curriculum was introduced in the early nineties.

A new library, designed by Robert A. M. Stern and Carroll Cline, opened in 1991; a $24 million, 95,000 sq. ft. Athletic & Fitness Center opened in 2004. The school celebrated its 150th anniversary in 2006. The new $50 million science and math building — the Lindsay Center — opened in fall 2011. The former visual arts center, the Hargate Building, underwent construction until 2017 to become the new Friedman Community Center in a $9 million renovation project.

The modern school, in addition to students drawn from the highest levels of American society and international elites, serves a diverse body of students from all backgrounds.

Facilities

The school's rural  campus is familiarly known as "Millville", after a now-abandoned mill whose relic still stands in the woods near the Lower School Pond. The overwhelming majority of the land comprises wild and wooded areas. The campus itself includes four ponds and the upper third of the Turkey River.

There are 19 dorms, nine boys', nine girls', and one all-gender, which each house between 20 and 40 students and are vertically integrated: every dorm has members of all four forms. The architecture of the dormitories varies from the Collegiate Gothic style of the "Quad" dorms (built in 1927) to the spare, modern style of the Kittredge building (built in the early 1970s).

Classes are held in five buildings: language and humanities classes meet in the Schoolhouse; math and science classes in the Lindsay Family Center for Mathematics and Science; visual arts in the Fine Arts Building; music and ballet classes in the Oates Performing Arts Center; and theater classes, in the New Space black box theater. The Schoolhouse, Moore and the Lindsay Center form a quadrangle, along with Memorial Hall, the 600-seat theater used for all-school gatherings not suited to the chapel space.

Lindsay Center contains a greenhouse and an observatory.

Overlooking the Lower School Pond, the Ohrstrom Library was remodeled in 2016 and is now home to 75,000 print books and almost half a million e-books in its digital archive, "putting the School archives on par with some of the country’s major universities." Perhaps the focal point of the campus is the Chapel of St. Peter and St. Paul, constructed between 1886 and 1888, also known as the New Chapel. There is an Old Chapel, used only for ceremonial events as it is too small now to accommodate the entire faculty and student body.

Dormitories

Boys' dormitories
Armour (1914): Given by his parents in memory of Edmund Armour (Form of 1917), who died while a student, Armour House was in its day the most modern medical facility in the region, complete with operating rooms. It was renovated in 1996 to house 29 students and three faculty families.
Coit North — located in Coit (1902): Originally the Upper School, it was renamed by the trustees in May 1995 for the First Rector, the Rev. Henry A. Coit. The three separate houses are now called Coit North, Coit Center, and Coit Wing. It was primarily a Sixth Form dormitory until 1965. The School's kitchens were consolidated here in 1962, and two more dining rooms were opened in 1968.
Drury (1939): Named for the Rev. Samuel S. Drury, Fourth Rector, it has been both a boys' and a girls' dormitory. Additional faculty apartments were added in 1994.
Foster (1901): Originally built as his home by Vice Rector William H. Foster (Form of 1881), master 1883–1928; it became a dormitory in 1929.
Kittredge I — located in Kittredge (1971): Named in memory of Henry C. Kittredge, Sixth Rector, this dormitory was designed with alcoves for First and Second Formers and was converted in 1973 when the Lower School was phased out. The architect was Edward L. Barnes.
Manville (1926): Renovated during the summer of 1997, it is one of the four identical "Quad" dormitories designed by Charles Z. Klauder. Originally housing Third and Fourth Formers and dedicated in October 1927, it was the gift of H. E. Manville. Over its entrance is an owl, representing wisdom.
Middle (1955): This dormitory was built on the site of the old Middle, a wooden building that in 1865 was the Lower School but had earlier been the Moses Shute Cottage, a farmhouse. Was used as a girls' dormitory until 2015.
Nash (1915): Originally built as the Lower School Study, it became a home for the Art Department in the early 1960s. In 1965 it was converted to a dormitory in memory of the Rev. Norman B. Nash, Fifth Rector. A large common room was added in 1994.
Simpson (1926): The fourth of the "Quad" buildings designed by Charles Z. Klauder, it was the gift of James Simpson and has a pelican, symbol of loyalty, over its entrance. It was renovated in 1997.

Girls' dormitories
Brewster (1926): Renovated during the summer of 1996, it is one of four buildings designed by Charles Z. Klauder (Ford, Manville, and Simpson being the other three) that make up the Quadrangle. It was a gift of George S. Brewster (Form of 1886) and Robert S. Brewster (Form of 1893). Over its entrance is a rooster, representing alertness.
Coit Center — located in Coit (1902): See "Coit North" above.
Coit Wing — located in Coit (1902): See "Coit North" above.
Conover/Twenty (1961): Two of three dormitories designed as a unit by Edward L. Barnes. Conover was named after the Rev. James P. Conover (Form of 1876), master 1882–1915. Twenty was named after an earlier dormitory that housed 20 boys.
Ford (1926): The gift of Emory M. Ford (Form of 1924) and for many years a Third and Fourth Form dormitory, it is one of the four "Quad" houses designed by Charles Z. Klauder. Over its entrance is an eagle, representing courage. It was renovated during the summer of 1997.
Kehaya (1993): The gift of Helga and Ery W. Kehaya (Form of 1942), it opened as a girls' dormitory in January 1994.
Kittredge II — located in Kittredge (1971): See "Kittredge I" above.
Kittredge III — located in Kittredge (1971): See "Kittredge I" above.
Warren (1918): Originally known as Friendly House, built to accommodate female employees, it was converted to a girls' dormitory in 1988 and named in memory of the Rev. Matthew M. Warren, Seventh Rector. It was later used as a boys' dormitory until 2015.

All-gender dormitory
Warren I : See "Warren" above.

Daily life

St. Paul's operates on a six-day school week, Monday through Saturday. Wednesdays and Saturdays, however, are half-days, with athletic games or practices in the afternoons. The school has four grades, known at St. Paul's as "forms". For example, "Third Form" corresponds to ninth grade, up through "Sixth Form", which corresponds to twelfth grade.

For Paulies, as St. Paul's students are colloquially known, the four full days each week begin with Chapel. The mandatory interfaith half-hour meeting involves a reading, speech or music presentation, and community-wide announcements.

St. Paul's conducts its Humanities classes using the Harkness method, which encourages discussion between students and the teacher, and between students. The average class size according to the school's website is 10–12 students.

Rather than having physical education classes, St. Paul's requires all its students to play sports. These sports range from the internationally competing crew to intramural hockey.

Throughout the fall, winter, and spring terms, students attend twelve seated meals, at which formal attire is required. Seven students and a faculty member are randomly assigned to each table for a family-style dinner, and the table is excused only after everyone has eaten. In the winter, students have dinner with their advisers and advisee groups (a group of 5–6 students are assigned a faculty member to be their adviser), either at the adviser's home or at the Upper Dining Hall. The school supplies money for one meal in town.

In the evenings, meetings are held for clubs and activities, music ensembles like the chorus and band, theater rehearsals, a cappella groups (the all-male Testostertones, the all-female Mad Hatters, and the co-ed Deli Line), and other extracurriculars.

Athletics 

Malcolm Gordon coached ice hockey at the school for 29 years, and noted World War I fighter pilot Hobey Baker played under him. The first squash courts in the United States were built at St. Paul's in 1884.

St. Paul's, and Concord, New Hampshire, were early cradles for ice hockey in America. By some accounts, the first hockey game in the United States was played on Lower School Pond November 17, 1883. The school was an established leader in the sport in the early 20th century, playing and beating collegiate teams, including Harvard and Princeton.

St. Paul's crew won the Princess Elizabeth Challenge Cup at the Henley Royal Regatta in 1980, 1994 and again in 2004.

The athletic directors of St. Paul's and the other members of the Eight Schools Association compose the Eight Schools Athletic Council, which organizes sports events and tournaments among ESA schools.

St. Paul's was also a member of the Independent School League (ISL) until 2017. The school announced the decision to withdraw from the ISL in 2016 due to league bylaws surrounding scholarships. Since the 2017–18 academic year, the school competes in the Six Schools League (SSL) with Choate, Deerfield, Northfield Mount Hermon, Andover, and Exeter. Additionally, the school competes in the Lakes Region League with Proctor Academy, New Hampton School, Kimball Union Academy, Tilton School, Holderness School, Vermont Academy, The White Mountain School, and Brewster Academy.

Culture

Religion
St. Paul's is an Episcopal school, although mandatory services are now non-denominational. There is a school prayer:"Grant, O Lord, that in all the joys of life, we may never forget to be kind.
Help us to be unselfish in friendship, thoughtful of those less happy than ourselves, and eager to bear the burdens of others.
Through Jesus Christ our Savior, Amen."

There is an on campus Jewish organization serving faculty and students of that religion.

Socialization 

According to Shamus Khan, author of Privilege: The Making of an Adolescent Elite at St. Paul's School (2010) and a sociologist who is a St. Paul's alumnus, students are socialized to function as privileged holders of power and status in an open society. Privilege in meritocracy is acquired through talent, hard work, and a wide variety of cultural and social experiences. Economic inequality and social inequality are explained by the lack of talent, hard work, and limited cultural and social experience of the less privileged. Thus high status is earned, not based on entitlement. According to Khan, "Today what is distinct among the elite is not their exclusivity but their ease within and broad acceptance of a more open world."

Hierarchy is embedded in the rituals and traditions of the school from the first day. According to Khan, the student advances up the ladder of the hierarchy embedded in the culture of the school.

Traditions

St. Paul's is home to many long-standing traditions. Near the start of the school year, the Rector announces a surprise holiday — Cricket Holiday — in morning Chapel. Classes are canceled for the day and the Rector leads new students and faculty on a tour of the woods surrounding the School. Tuesdays are generally preferred for the holiday by the Rector as students who leave the grounds are forced to return by the start time of Seated Meal or Advisee Dinner. The tradition dates back to the first Rector, Henry Augustus Coit, who preferred cricket over baseball as a "more refined sport".

During February, the Missionary Society (the school's community service organization) plans and announces Mish Holiday. The holiday is announced the day before, the evening is given over to a theme dance, and the next day is a day off from school. The Missionary Society has used extravagant stunts to announce the holiday, including, in the past, fireworks over the Lower School Pond and a plane trailing a "Happy Mish!" banner.

Students at St. Paul's are assigned to one of three "clubs" for their time at St. Paul's — "Isthmian," "Delphian" or "Old Hundred". Those who participate in "club sports" (intramural) play for their club. Students who participate in crew are also assigned to one of two "Boat Clubs" – "Halcyon" or "Shattuck". Descendants of graduates are assigned to the same clubs as their relatives.

The annual Inter-House Inter-Club Race, known among students as the "Dorm Run," but now officially named the "Charles B. Morgan Run", takes place late in Fall Term, usually in early to mid-November. Students are invited to earn points for their dorm and club by running in a  cross country race. The current student record is 9:48, set in 2006 by Peter Harrison '07.

During a weekend in the Fall Term, the Student Council holds Fall Ball, a dinner/dance known among students as the Cocktails. On the same night, there is a talent show that focuses on fifth formers (eleventh graders). Fifth former MCs are selected by their form representatives to host the show.

During the Winter Term, the school holds the annual Fiske Cup Competition. Each participating dorm produces a student-directed and performed play. Most plays are held in dorm common rooms.

In the Spring Term, St. Paul's holds a school-wide public speaking contest called the Hugh Camp Cup. The finalists' speeches are delivered before the entire school, and the student body votes on a winner, whose name is engraved on the prize. Alumnus John Kerry achieved this distinction during his sixth form year.

On the last night of the term, students gather in the Chapel at 9 p.m. for the Last Night service. At the Last Night service for Spring Term, the last night of school before summer vacation, the faculty lines up outside the Chapel after the service and students shake hands with every member as they exit. On the Sixth Formers' last night on campus, they gather as a class in the Old Chapel. At the conclusion of the service, the rest of the student body waits outside to congratulate them and say their goodbyes.

During Anniversary Weekend, held on the first weekend of June, alumni converge on the school for get-togethers, reunions, and the annual Alumni Parade. Each form (class) marches down Chapel Road in chronological order, starting with the oldest living alumni. In the back of this long column is the about-to-graduate Sixth Form.

St. Paul's students once had a close relationship with jam bands like the Grateful Dead. Some of the slang peculiar to St. Paul's originated as the "Pyramid Dialect" among St. Paul's students and alumni who followed the Grateful Dead's 1978 shows in Egypt. Phish played in the Upper Dining Hall on May 19, 1990. American electro house artist Steve Aoki performed in the school's Athletic & Fitness Center on April 9, 2015.

Advanced Studies Program

St. Paul's School founded the summer Advanced Studies Program in 1957 to provide juniors from public and parochial New Hampshire high schools with challenging educational opportunities. The students live and study at the St. Paul's campus for five and a half weeks and are immersed in their subject of choice. Recent offerings have included astronomy and Shakespeare. In addition to the course load, students choose a daily extracurricular activity or sport to participate in four afternoons per week. The program had a 37% admission rate in 2010. In 2014, 267 students from 78 high schools participated in the Advanced Studies Program. According to its website, "The Advanced Studies Program is committed to educating the whole person and preparing students to make contributions to a changing and challenging world. ASP defines education as all of the structured experiences in which students participate: course work, athletics, extracurricular activities, and residential life. These opportunities involve valuable interaction between faculty, interns, house advisers, and students."

Controversies

Historical sexual misconduct

In May 2017, the school issued a report, led by former Massachusetts Attorney General Scott Harshbarger, detailing sexual misconduct by 13 former faculty and staff members (including Gerry Studds) that occurred between 1948 and 1988. The report did not focus on any allegations that occurred after 1988. Sexual misconduct documented in the report covered assaults, harassments, and rape. One student who contacted The Boston Globe, but not the people conducting the report said, "It's not a complete accounting. It's nowhere close." Any further historical allegations are reported by an independent overseer.

In July 2020, author Lacy Crawford published her memoir of being raped as a 15-year-old student on campus, and the school's subsequent cover-up.

Claims of financial misappropriation

Craig B. Anderson, the Episcopal bishop who was St. Paul's rector for eight years, retired under pressure in May 2005 after a campaign by parents and alumni that criticized his management of school finances and investments. Anderson had severely cut back on school expenses while simultaneously being quite liberal with his own compensation and perks. There was an investigation by the Attorney General of New Hampshire that resulted in a settlement agreement and an audit by the IRS.

"Senior Salute" rape allegations and trial

The "Senior Salute", a supposed ceremony in which seniors would proposition younger classmates for sexual encounters before graduation, was in the news in 2015, when a former student was charged with the rape of a 15-year-old freshman, Chessy Prout. A St. Paul's student, Owen Labrie, was charged with several counts of felony sex assault, misdemeanor sexual assault, endangering the welfare of a child, and using a computer to solicit or lure a child under the age of 16.

On August 28, 2015, Labrie was found guilty on three counts of statutory rape and one count of endangering the welfare of a child and one felony count of using a computer to lure a minor. On October 29, 2015, he was sentenced to a year in jail and five years of probation and is required to register as a sex offender. The New Hampshire Supreme Court unanimously denied Labrie's first appeal of his conviction in November 2018. A second appeal, in which Labrie claimed ineffective assistance of legal counsel at trial, was unanimously denied in June 2019.  A confidential settlement was reached with the victim. In June 2019, Labrie was released early from a 12-month sentence due to good behavior and the New Hampshire Supreme Court unanimously denied his appeal for a new trial.

Chessy Prout, with the help of Jenn Abelson, an investigative reporter for The Boston Globe, published her memoir of the incident, I Have the Right To: A High School Survivor's Story of Sexual Assault, Justice, and Hope, on March 6, 2018.

Criminal investigation by Attorney General

In July 2017, the New Hampshire Attorney General, with assistance from Concord police and the New Hampshire State Police, started a criminal investigation into the school to determine whether administrators engaged in conduct that endangered the welfare of students. In 2018, the state AG reached a settlement agreement with the school to avoid criminal prosecution. In 2020, the overseer of the settlement abruptly resigned, citing verbal abuse and obstruction by the school of his ongoing investigations.

Notable alumni

Notable faculty
 James Milnor Coit, teacher
 George A. Gordon, United States Ambassador to Haiti and the Netherlands
 Richard Lederer, English teacher, author and compiler of humorous errors in the use of the English language
 Gerry Studds, who later served as U.S. congressman from Massachusetts
 John T. Walker, first African-American Episcopal bishop of Washington, D.C.
 John Gilbert Winant, governor of New Hampshire; ambassador to Great Britain during World War II

See also 

 Boarding school
 College-preparatory school
 Saint Grottlesex, a colloquial expression for several of the area's prep schools

References

Footnotes

External links

 

Boarding schools in New Hampshire
Private high schools in New Hampshire
Co-educational boarding schools
Independent School League
Episcopal schools in the United States
Preparatory schools in New Hampshire
Schools in Concord, New Hampshire
Educational institutions established in 1856
1856 establishments in New Hampshire
 
Schools in Merrimack County, New Hampshire
School sexual abuse scandals
Six Schools League